In physics, the ARGUS distribution, named after the particle physics experiment ARGUS, is the probability distribution of the reconstructed invariant mass of a decayed particle candidate in continuum background.

Definition 
The probability density function (pdf) of the ARGUS distribution is:

Cumulative distribution function 
The cumulative distribution function (cdf) of the ARGUS distribution is
.

Parameter estimation 
Parameter c is assumed to be known (the kinematic limit of the invariant mass distribution), whereas χ can be estimated from the sample X1, …, Xn using the maximum likelihood approach. The estimator is a function of sample second moment, and is given as a solution to the non-linear equation
.

The solution exists and is unique, provided that the right-hand side is greater than 0.4; the resulting estimator  is consistent and asymptotically normal.

Generalized ARGUS distribution 
Sometimes a more general form is used to describe a more peaking-like distribution:

where Γ(·) is the gamma function, and Γ(·,·) is the upper incomplete gamma function.

Here parameters c, χ, p represent the cutoff, curvature, and power respectively.

The mode is:

The mean is:

where M(·,·,·) is the Kummer's confluent hypergeometric function.

The variance is:

p = 0.5 gives a regular ARGUS, listed above.

References

Further reading

Experimental particle physics
Continuous distributions